Moissaye Boguslawski (November 1, 1887 – August 30, 1944) was an American pianist, composer, editor and teacher. Sometimes known as Bogie.

Biography
He was born in Chicago in 1887 to Russian immigrants with significant musical background. Despite the family's poverty, Boguslawski began piano lessons at age 4 and began playing in public at weddings at the age of 10. By age 15 he was performing at a dance hall in Chicago. He also studied briefly with Rudolph Ganz.

Boguslawski was named head of the piano department at the Kansas City Conservatory of Music when he was twenty years old. Recitals given during this time established him as a well-known pianist, and in 1916 a trip to the East Coast earned him good reviews in New York and Boston. Soon he was a sought-after performer both in concert and as a recorded radio performer. He performed with various orchestras and performers, including Emma Calvé and Antonio Scotti. For Chicago's WJJD radio station (now WYLL), Boguslawski played all of Bach's piano music and all of the sonatas of Beethoven, taking a total of 21 weeks to accomplish. He was a professor of piano at Chicago Musical College and at the Bush Conservatory of Music; later he was head of the Boguslawski College of Music., where students included Cecilia Clare Bocard.

Later in his career, Boguslawski composed pieces of his own, including a comprehensive set of children's teaching pieces with publisher M. M. Cole. Compositions include Hungarian Rhapsodie No. 1, Valse Russe, Frog's Frolic, and Overture to a Carnival.

Boguslawski was known for skillfully attracting media attention. A 1936 piece in TIME magazine said of him, "When straight news about himself is scarce, 'Bogie' is likely to come forth with such a project as his proposal to promote world peace through voice culture, since animosity arises when unpleasant tones are heard." Whatever his motivation, Boguslawski did influence the fields of music psychology and music therapy, contributing his theories about curing antisocial behavior and memory loss.

References

1887 births
1944 deaths
American male classical composers
American classical composers
American classical pianists
American male pianists
20th-century classical composers
Composers for piano
American music educators
American people of Russian-Jewish descent
Jewish American musicians
Musicians from Chicago
Roosevelt University faculty
University of Missouri–Kansas City faculty
20th-century American composers
Classical musicians from Illinois
20th-century classical pianists
20th-century American male musicians
20th-century American pianists